Aschbach-Markt is a town in the district of Amstetten in Lower Austria in Austria.

Geography
Aschbach-Markt lies in the Mostviertel about 10 km from Amstetten. The Url River flows through the municipality.

References

Cities and towns in Amstetten District